Eskibağ is a village in the Genç District, Bingöl Province, Turkey. The village had a population of 170 in 2021.

The hamlet of Çöğürlü is attached to the village.

References 

Villages in Genç District
Kurdish settlements in Bingöl Province